Dance is the third solo studio album by English new wave musician Gary Numan, released in 4 September 1981 by Beggars Banquet Records. It was the first studio album Numan released after his "Farewell Concerts" staged at Wembley Arena (although Numan would return to performing live shows in 1982).

Dance features the UK Top 10 single "She's Got Claws". The album itself reached #3 on the UK charts.

Overview
Dance was Numan's most experimental album to date with a minimalistic approach featuring sparse electronic sounds and prolific use of drum machines and percussion. With synth-pop music in the mainstream by 1981, Numan made a conscious effort to explore new musical areas. Influenced by Brian Eno, Kraftwerk and Japan, Numan hired Japan's bassist Mick Karn to play on the album.

Lyrically the songs were inspired by the imagery of authors William S. Burroughs and J. G. Ballard and features Numan's own personal experiences, particularly a relationship that had turned bitter.

Critical reception
Reaction to the album was mixed, some critics applauding what they saw as a less commercial career move and others viewing the change of pace with cynicism. A positive review appeared in Smash Hits magazine which gave the album a 9 out of 10 rating, describing the music as "timeless". Writing for NME, Paul Morley argued that the album elevated Numan above many synthesizer contemporaries: "Dance does prove that when judged against his proper peers he can come out well... It's a thoughtful response to the new competition: Numan self-controlled and sophisticated. He can filter and exploit past noises as sensibly, even surprisingly, as anyone" but that the music lacked other things: "Dance is Numan's neatest, cleanest and most responsible homage to Brian Eno. The elements of Eno's meditative adjustments and slippy neology are used well, but Another Green World'''s breathtaking personality, intimacy, grace and irony is missing."

A few years after Dance's release Numan conceded, "if I was supposed to be a pop star doing music for the masses, it probably wasn't the right thing to do", but he praised the standard of playing on it. "She's Got Claws" was the album's sole single release, making number 6 in the UK charts, whilst the album itself peaked at number 3. It was Numan's first album to miss the number 1 spot since Tubeway Army's debut studio album in 1978, dropping out of the charts after 8 weeks.

Legacy
Numan very rarely performs any music from the album in concert. However live recordings and visual footage of "She's Got Claws", "Cry the Clock Said" and "Moral" ("Metal") appear on Numan's video/DVD Micromusic and album Living Ornaments '81, taken when they were previewed prior to the release of Dance at his Wembley 'farewell' concerts in April 1981.

On his website on 30 March 2010, Numan mentioned that "Crash" was one of the songs rehearsed for his set at the Manchester and London "Back to the Phuture" shows.

Track listing

 Previous CD releases of Dance (Japan in 1990, and the UK in 1993) included "Love Needs No Disguise", Numan's 1981 single with Dramatis, as a bonus track. The track was subsequently replaced by its B-side, "Face to Face", for the subsequent edition of Dance, although "Love Needs No Disguise" would be included on the 1996 Numan compilation, The Premier Hits.

On 19 January 2018, Beggars Arkive released Dance as a vinyl double-album, with the following track listing:

 The only previously-unreleased track in the 2018 edition of Dance is the extended version of "Moral," which is over a minute longer than the version in the original album. The 2018 edition of Dance otherwise replicates the track listing of the standard CD edition.

Personnel
 Gary Numan – vocals, Polymoog, SCI Prophet-5, Roland Jupiter-4, Yamaha CP-30, ARP Odyssey, Roland CR-78, Linn LM-1, Claptrap, guitar, bass, piano, percussion, claves, handclaps
 Paul Gardiner – bass, guitar, ARP Odyssey
 Cedric Sharpley – drums
 Chris Payne – viola
 John Webb – Roland Jupiter-4, Linn LM-1, handclaps
 Jess Lidyard – drums
 Mick Karn – fretless bass, saxophone
 Nash the Slash – violin
 Roger Taylor – drums, tom-toms
 Rob Dean – guitar
 Tim Steggles – percussion
 Sean Lynch – Linn LM-1
 Connie Filapello – vocals
 Roger Mason – SCI Prophet-5, Yamaha CP-30
 Mick Prague – bass

Charts

Notes

References
 Paul Goodwin (2004). Electric Pioneer: An Armchair Guide To Gary Numan''
 [ Allmusic]

External links
 

Gary Numan albums
1981 albums
Beggars Banquet Records albums